Darrin Jay Jackson (born August 22, 1963) is the current radio color analyst  for the Chicago White Sox and also a former center fielder in Major League Baseball who played 12 years for the Chicago Cubs (1985–1989), San Diego Padres (1989–1992), Toronto Blue Jays (1993), New York Mets (1993), Chicago White Sox (1994, 1999), Minnesota Twins (1997) and Milwaukee Brewers (1997–1998). He also played for the Seibu Lions in Japan (1995–1996).

External links

1963 births
Living people
African-American baseball players
American expatriate baseball players in Canada
American expatriate baseball players in Japan
Baseball players from Chicago
Baseball players from Los Angeles
Chicago Cubs players
Chicago White Sox announcers
Major League Baseball broadcasters
Chicago White Sox players
Major League Baseball outfielders
Milwaukee Brewers players
Minnesota Twins players
New York Mets players
Nippon Professional Baseball outfielders
Sportspeople from Chicago
San Diego Padres players
Seibu Lions players
Toronto Blue Jays players
Gulf Coast Cubs players
Iowa Cubs players
Las Vegas Stars (baseball) players
Midland Cubs players
Pittsfield Cubs players
Quad Cities Cubs players
Salinas Spurs players
Salt Lake Buzz players
21st-century African-American people
20th-century African-American sportspeople